Dongmoa is a harvestman genus in the family Podoctidae with 2 described species.

Harvestmen